Michael Clinton  was a Scottish footballer, who played as a wing half.

Clinton was best known for his time at Clyde where he made over 200 appearances in all competitions, and was part of the 1957–58 Scottish Cup winning team. He also won the Glasgow Cup later that year, and was selected for the Glasgow FA side to play against the Sheffield FA in 1960.

Clinton returned to Clyde in September 1976 to take over as interim manager for three months after Stan Anderson fell ill.

References

Clyde F.C. players
Clyde F.C. managers
Raith Rovers F.C. players
Scottish footballers
Scottish Football League players
Association football wing halves
Ashfield F.C. players
Caledonian F.C. players
Cowdenbeath F.C. players
Scottish Junior Football Association players